Volodomyr Yezhov ("Fresh") (1984 - December 22, 2022) was a Ukrainian video game developer and game designer. He was one of the developers of the game S.T.A.L.K.E.R. He died in the defense of Ukraine against the Russian invasion.

Biography

Until 2007, Volodymyr Yezhov worked as a game designer at GSC Game World. He articipated in the creation of such games as S.T.A.L.K.E.R., Clear Sky, "Cossacks", World of Battles: Morningstar, Call of Cthulhu and Sherlock Holmes: Devil's Daughter. In S.T.A.L.K.E.R. Yezhov made the character of Loki his own face. 

Starting from February 24, 2022, he defended Kyiv as a volunteer in the UVO company, formed by veterans of the "OUN" battalion on the eve of the Russian invasion, later the commander of the air reconnaissance unit of the 23rd special purpose battalion of the Separate Presidential Brigade.

On December 22, 2022, Volodymyr Yezhov died defending Ukraine from the Russian invaders in the battles near Bakhmut. On December 27, 2022, a farewell ceremony for Yezhov was held in the Volodymyr Cathedral with the participation of a military guard, which was attended by many people.

He is buried at the Forest Cemetery.

References

1984 births
2022 deaths
Kyiv Polytechnic Institute alumni
S.T.A.L.K.E.R.
Ukrainian military personnel killed in the 2022 Russian invasion of Ukraine
uk:Єжов Володимир Анатолійович